Joshua Randles (June 1865 – 17 October 1925) was an English footballer who was a one club man for Burslem Port Vale between 1885 and 1899.

Career
Randles probably joined Burslem Port Vale in the autumn of 1885. His first known game was at left-half in a 6–0 triumph over Cheshire side Crewe Alexandra in a friendly on 26 October 1885. He enjoyed regular football from September 1888 to February 1889, but played only occasional football thereafter. He played two Second Division games in the 1892–93 season, the club's first season in the English Football League. He did not feature in the 1893–94 campaign, and only played twice in the 1894–95 season. He did though play seven games in the 1895–96 season, claiming two goals against both Newton Heath and Newcastle United. Over the course of his 14 years at the Athletic Ground he had played in nine different positions for the club in 75 games, scoring 14 goals. Upon retiring as a player Randles became Vale's assistant trainer and later the reserve team trainer.

Career statistics
Source:

A.  The "Other" column constitutes appearances and goals in friendlies.

References

1865 births
1925 deaths
Sportspeople from Burslem
English footballers
Association football midfielders
Port Vale F.C. players
Midland Football League players
English Football League players
Association football coaches
Port Vale F.C. non-playing staff